What Happened in the Tunnel is a 1903 short film starring Bertha Regustus and Gilbert M. Anderson. The film was directed and shot by Edwin S. Porter, produced by Edison Mfg. Co., and distributed by Edison Mfg. Co. and Kleine Optical Co.

Plot 
Inside a railroad car, a black maid sits next to a white woman. Behind both women sits a white man reading a newspaper. The woman drops her handkerchief. The man hands it back to her and starts to flirt with her. The train enters the tunnel and the film fades to black. As the train emerges from the tunnel, the two women have switched places and the man is kissing the black maid. The man looks around to see if anyone else saw and sits back down in embarrassment as the two women share a laugh over their prank.

Cast 

 Bertha Regustus – The black maid
 Gilbert M. Anderson – The white man

Reception
In the book, For the Love of Pleasure: Women, Movies, and Culture in Turn-of-the-century Chicago, the author describes how the film deals with "how widespread and exemplary is this syntactical employment of gendered, classed, and racial elements for the empowerment, not of a generalized but of a highly particular kind of female gaze."

See also 
 1900s in film
 1903 in film
 Edwin S. Porter
 Broncho Billy Anderson
 African American cinema
 Silent film
 African American Women in the silent film era

References 

American silent films
Films directed by Edwin S. Porter
1900s American films